Doralice Nascimento de Souza better known as Dora Nascimento is a Brazilian politician. She was Vice Governor of Amapá in Brazil. She is also a geographer.

References 

1967 births
Living people
Brazilian politicians
Brazilian women in politics
People from Macapá